KECG (88.1 FM), stylized as keCg, is a noncommercial educational radio station,  broadcasting a variety format. Licensed to El Cerrito, California, United States, the station is owned by El Cerrito High School. The station is operated by the school, and is a broadcast service of the West Contra Costa Unified School District.

Translators
In addition to the main transmitter on 88.1, KECG is relayed by translator K249DJ on 97.7 FM, which widens its broadcast area. This translator was originally licensed in 1994 at 89.9 FM, but the frequency was changed due to a dispute with Howell Mountain Broadcasting, licensee of what was then KNDL 89.9 FM, in Angwin.

History
Construction of KECG began in 1972, in the basement of the north wing of the old El Cerrito High School. Mr. Maynes' wood shop built the studios, and the electronics department, under Elmer Peterson, installed the electronics. Originally, KECG was supposed to broadcast "elevator-style" music.

The activation of the transmitter was delayed several years. When the station filed for a construction permit in 1976, NPR station KQED-FM objected to KECG going on the air, stating that "they should broadcast over the telephone line" and raising interference concerns. KGO-TV news anchor Van Amburg was quite helpful, having continued his FCC certification even after moving from engineering to on-air talent. KECG began broadcasting in September 1978; by then, the "elevator music" format plan had been dropped.

After Elmer Peterson died, responsibility for KECG moved from the Industrial Arts division to new leadership, with a more journalistic emphasis. In 2005, the old campus was demolished. KECG's current studios are located on the 2nd floor of the main building of the new campus of El Cerrito High School.

References

External links

FCC History Cards for KECG

ECG
Mass media in Contra Costa County, California
El Cerrito, California
Radio stations established in 1978
Community radio stations in the United States
1978 establishments in California
High school radio stations in the United States